The Mozartinterpretationspreis (Mozart Interpretation Prize) was a music award named after Wolfgang Amadeus Mozart, administered by the Mozartgemeinde Wien (Vienna Mozart Society) and sponsored by the Austrian Ministry of Education and Culture. It was awarded from 1963 to 1998.

Recipients
The 35 recipients have been:

 Wiener Trio, 1963
 Wiener Sängerknaben, 1964
 Weller Quartett, 1965
 Werner Krenn with Ralph Weikert, 1966
 Die Wiener Solisten, 1967
 Capella Academia der Wiener Akademie für Musik, 1968
 Heinz Medjimorec with Günter Pichler, 1969
 Rudolf Buchbinder, 1970
 Gerhard Zeller, 1971
 Agnes Grossman, 1972
 Rainer Küchl, 1973
 Chor und Orchester des BRG IX, 1974
 Franz Schubert-Quartett, 1975
 Peter Weber, 1976
 Regine Winkelmayer, 1977
 Michael Werba, 1978
 Christian Simonis, 1979
 Christian Altenburger, 1980
 Gabriele Fontana, 1981
 Karin Adam, 1982
 Igo Koch, 1983
 Hagen Quartet, 1984
 Elisabeth Schadler, 1985
 Arnold Schönberg Choir, 1989
 Ensemble Oktogon, 1990
 Kurt Azesberger, 1991
 Wiener Streichsextett, 1992
 Angelika Kirchschlager, 1993
 Stefan Vladar, 1994
 Anton Scharinger, 1995
 Seifert-Quartett, 1996
 Barbara Moser, 1997
 Till Fellner, 1998

References

Sources 
 
 

Austrian music awards